Graham Jennings (born 18 January 1960) is a former Australian association footballer, who played predominantly as a defender and was renowned for his speed, earning him the nickname flash. After a distinguished club and international career spanning twenty years, Jennings was inducted into the Australian Football Hall of Fame in 1999, receiving the Award of Distinction. Graham is married to wife Louise, and has three children.

Club career
A native of Newcastle, Jennings began playing football at the age of seven with local team Hamilton Azzurri. As a teenager, he moved to one of the region's biggest clubs in Adamstown Rosebud, and eventually made his senior debut at the age of 16. In 1978, he earned his first representative cap with Northern New South Wales, and after impressive displays for the Australian youth team later that year, he joined Sydney Olympic in the National Soccer League .

Sydney Olympic
Playing initially as an attacking winger, Jennings' first season with Olympic witnessed relegation from the NSL, but he played a key role in helping the club achieve promotion in 1980. The arrival of Manfred Schaefer to Pratten Park resulted in a move to left-back, a position he would make his own for the remainder of his career. After consecutive finals appearances with Olympic in 1984 (losing in the Grand Final to South Melbourne) and 1985, Jennings transferred to rivals Sydney Croatia.

Sydney Croatia
Jennings tasted success immediately with Croatia, helping them claim the Minor Premiership in the Northern Conference in 1986. He played in all but two games for the club in 1988, as Croatia stormed their way into the Grand Final only to lose to Marconi-Fairfield in a penalty-shootout. After a disappointing season the following year, he moved to A.P.I.A. Leichhardt.

A.P.I.A. and Newcastle
Jennings was an ever present in the A.P.I.A squad, but once the club was demoted from the NSL, he returned to his hometown, firstly with Adamstown Rosebud and then with the Newcastle Breakers in 1993–94, where he played in every game but one in what proved to be his final season at national club level. He returned to Adamstown Rosebud for the remainder of the 1994 New South Wales Super League season, retiring from football upon its conclusion.

International career
His impressive club form with Adamstown Rosebud earned selection in Australia's inaugural youth team in 1978, where he played in the Oceania World Youth Cup qualifiers. In 1983, he made his debut for the senior national team, playing against England in a friendly at the Sydney Cricket Ground. This began a long career with the Socceroos, where Jennings became a stalwart in successive World Cup campaigns, and an Olympian in 1988, in what proved to be the final open age football tournament in Seoul. In all, Jennings played 84 times for his country, 44 of which were full 'A' internationals.

Honours 
With Australia:
 Trans-Tasman Cup: 1986, 1988. 1987 (runners-up)
 President's Cup: 1987 (runners-up)
 Bicentennial Gold Cup: 1988 (runners-up)
 Merlion Cup: 1983
With Sydney Olympic:
 NSL Championship: 1984 (runners-up)
 NSL Cup: 1983, 1985
With Sydney Croatia:
 NSL Championship: 1988 (runners-up)
 NSL Cup: 1987
Personal honours:
 FFA Hall of Fame Inductee - 1999

References

External links 
 OzFootball profile
 Football Federation Australia Hall of Fame
 Newcastle Cultural Collections

1960 births
Living people
Australian soccer players
Australia under-20 international soccer players
Australia international soccer players
Olympic soccer players of Australia
Footballers at the 1988 Summer Olympics
National Soccer League (Australia) players
APIA Leichhardt FC players
Sydney Olympic FC players
Sydney United 58 FC players
Sportspeople from Newcastle, New South Wales
Association football defenders
Newcastle Breakers FC players